Franco Ferrari (born 10 August 1995) is an Argentine professional footballer who plays as forward for  club Vicenza. He also holds Italian citizenship.

Club career
He made his Serie C debut for Tuttocuoio on 22 January 2017 in a game against Lupa Roma.

On 3 August 2018, he joined Brescia on loan.

On 14 January 2019, he moved on another loan, to Piacenza.

On 3 August 2019, Ferrari joined Serie C club Bari on loan from Napoli until 30 June 2020.

On 30 January 2020 he moved on loan to Livorno.

On 3 October 2020 he was loaned to Como.

On 3 August 2021, he joined Pescara on loan.

On 22 July 2022, Ferrari signed a three-year contract with Vicenza.

Personal life
Ferrari's brother, Gianluca, is also a professional footballer.

References

External links

1995 births
Footballers from Rosario, Santa Fe
Living people
Argentine footballers
Association football forwards
Argentine sportspeople of Italian descent
A.C. Tuttocuoio 1957 San Miniato players
U.S. Pistoiese 1921 players
Brescia Calcio players
Piacenza Calcio 1919 players
S.S.C. Bari players
U.S. Livorno 1915 players
Como 1907 players
Delfino Pescara 1936 players
L.R. Vicenza players
Serie B players
Serie C players
Serie D players